Sergio Martos Gornés (born 19 October 1994) is a Spanish tennis player.

Martos Gornés has a career high ATP singles ranking of World No. 726 achieved on 20 July 2015. He also has a career high doubles ranking of World No. 106 achieved on 6 February 2023.

Martos Gornés has won 4 ATP Challenger doubles titles at the 2021 Rafa Nadal Open, 2021 Vesuvio Cup, 2022 San Marino Open and the 2023 Tenerife Challenger.

Tour titles

Doubles

References

External links
 
 

1994 births
Living people
Spanish male tennis players
People from Ciutadella de Menorca
Sportspeople from Barcelona
Tennis players from the Balearic Islands